Novotroyevka is a rural locality (a village) in Mrakovsky Selsoviet, Gafuriysky District, Bashkortostan, Russia. The population was 32 as of 2010. There is 1 street.

Geography 
Novotroyevka is located 38 km southwest of Krasnousolsky (the district's administrative centre) by road. Mrakovo is the nearest rural locality.

References 

Rural localities in Gafuriysky District